The Mackenzies were a Scottish indie band from Glasgow, Scotland, active around 1986/87, who released two singles of jagged indie-funk on Ron Johnson Records. They contributed the track "Big Jim (There's No Pubs in Heaven)" to the NME 's C86 compilation. They also recorded two sessions for BBC Radio 1's John Peel, the first of which was repeated seven times, such was Peel's high regard for it.  When the band split up, the drummer Paul Turnbull resurfaced in The Secret Goldfish.

Discography 
"New Breed" / "Dog's Breakfast" (April 1986, Ron Johnson Records, ZRON9 [7"]) No. 15 (UK Indie Chart)
A Sensual Assault EP (February 1987, Ron Johnson Records, ZRON15 [12"]) No. 22 (UK Indie Chart)

References

External links 
Fan site with good information on Ron Johnson Records
Details of The Mackenzies' Peel Sessions

Scottish indie rock groups